The Diag is a large open space in the middle of the University of Michigan's Central Campus. Originally known as the Diagonal Green, the Diag derives its name from the many sidewalks running near or through it in diagonal directions. Many of the University's most frequented buildings are situated around the Diag, including West Hall, Randall Lab, the Shapiro Undergraduate Library, the Hatcher Graduate Library, and Angell, Mason, Haven, and Tisch Halls, among others.

In April 2008, spring commencement ceremonies were held at the Diag for the first time in the university's 191-year history, as the traditional commencement ceremony location, Michigan Stadium, was undergoing construction.

References

External links

University of Michigan campus